The Glimpses of the Moon is a 1923 American silent drama film directed by Allan Dwan and starring Bebe Daniels. It was produced by Famous Players-Lasky and distributed by Paramount Pictures. The film is based upon the 1922 Edith Wharton novel The Glimpses of the Moon.

Cast
Bebe Daniels as Susan Branch
David Powell as Nick Lansing
Nita Naldi as Ursula Gillow
Maurice Costello as Fred Gillow
Rubye De Remer as Mrs. Ellie Vanderlyn
Billy Quirk as Bob Fulmer (credited as William Quirk)
Charles K. Gerrard as Streffy, Lord Altringham
Pearl Sindelar as Grace Fullmer
Mrs. George Peggram
Beth Allen
Dolores Costello
Millie Muller
Beatrice Coburn
Fred Hadley

Preservation
The Glimpses of the Moon is a lost film.

References

External links

Sheet music to the film

1923 films
Films based on American novels
Lost American films
1923 drama films
Films based on works by Edith Wharton
American silent feature films
Films directed by Allan Dwan
American black-and-white films
Silent American drama films
1923 lost films
Lost drama films
1920s American films
1920s English-language films